Kokudo or Kokudō may refer to:

National Land
Ministry of Land, Infrastructure, Transport and Tourism, Kokudo-kōtsū-shō, Japan
Kokudo Keikaku, land development and leisure company under the Seibu Railway 
Kokudo Ice-hockey, sponsored by above company 1972, then 2006–2009 as Seibu Prince Rabbits

National Route
Kokudō 1-507, National highways of Japan
Kokudō Station (国道駅, Kokudō-eki), Yokohama
Hanshin-Kokudō Station (阪神国道駅, Hanshin-kokudō-eki), Nishinomiya